John Dowsey (1 May 1905 – 27 October 1942) was an English professional footballer who played as a wing-half or inside-forward in the Football League for Newcastle United, West Ham United, Carlisle United, Sunderland, Notts County and Northampton Town.

Dowsey started his career with Hunswick Villa, moving to Newcastle United in June 1924. He featured regularly for the reserve team, scoring 54 goals in the North Eastern League during his two seasons at the club. He made his first of three first-team appearances for the Geordies on 14 November 1925 in a 3–1 home victory over Tottenham Hotspur.

He made the move to West Ham United in May 1926. His sole First Division appearance for the club came on 6 September 1926, where he played at inside-right in 1–0 loss to Sheffield Wednesday.

Dowsey joined Carlisle United in August 1927, then joined Sunderland in 1928. He moved to Notts County the following year and captained the team. He then joined Nuneaton Town in 1934 and played regularly in the Birmingham & District League as a centre-half.

References

1905 births
1942 deaths
People from Willington, County Durham
Footballers from County Durham
English footballers
Association football wing halves
Association football inside forwards
Newcastle United F.C. players
West Ham United F.C. players
Carlisle United F.C. players
Sunderland A.F.C. players
Notts County F.C. players
Northampton Town F.C. players
Nuneaton Borough F.C. players
English Football League players